Löwenwolde (Левенвольде, Lehvenvold) may refer to
Löwenwolde, Baltic German name of Liigvalla, Estonia
Löwenwolde's Treaty (1732), Austro-Prusso-Russian treaty regarding the Polish succession
Gerhard Johann von Löwenwolde (died 1721), Saxon and Russian diplomat and governor-general of Russian Livonia (1710-1713)
Karl Gustav von Löwenwolde (died 1735), Russian diplomat and military commander